Carnosol is a phenolic diterpene found in the herbs rosemary (Rosmarinus officinalis) and Mountain desert sage (Salvia pachyphylla).

It has been studied in-vitro for anti-cancer effects in various cancer cell types.

See also 
 Carnosic acid
 List of phytochemicals in food

References 

Diterpenes
Catechols
Lactones
Phenanthrenes